Sir William Stanier's London, Midland and Scottish Railway (LMS) Class 4P 2-Cylinder 2-6-4T was a class of 206 steam locomotive built between 1935 and 1943. They were based on his LMS 3-Cylinder 2-6-4T.

Numbering

The LMS numbered them 2425–94, and then 2537–672, BR adding 40000 to their numbers to make them 42425–94, and then 42537–672. The LMS classified them 4P, BR 4MT. They were the basis for the LMS Fairburn 2-6-4T.

Accidents and incidents

On 15 August 1953, locomotive No. 42474 was hauling a passenger train which collided with an electric multiple unit that overran signals at Irk Valley Junction, Manchester, Lancashire. The junction is on a viaduct, and one of the carriages of the electric multiple unit plunged  into the River Irk. Ten people were killed and 58 were injured.

Film use
No 2429 had a starring role as Celia Johnson's branch line engine in the 1945 film Brief Encounter, which was made at Carnforth station during the winter of 1944–45. The BR numberplate (42429) was sold at a BR auction held in the old Refreshment Room at Southport Chapel Street station.

Withdrawal
The first withdrawal was in 1960, with the last in 1967. None have been preserved (though the original of the 3-Cylinder 2-6-4T version, number 2500, is preserved at the National Railway Museum, and two examples of the nearly identical LMS Fairburn 2-6-4T are also still in existence).

Models
Hornby Model Railways has released Stanier's 4MT as a 00 Gauge ready-to-run model.  Two versions are to be released; one in LMS Black, the other in BR Black (early and late).

A pre-war O gauge model of this locomotive was produced by Marklin for Bassett-Lowke models in 1937; this continued in UK production by Winteringham until 1957.  This model has been reproduced in O gauge by ACE Trains in 2009; both LMS and BR black versions have been manufactured.

References

4 Stanier 2-6-4T (2-cyl)
2-6-4T locomotives
NBL locomotives
Railway locomotives introduced in 1935
Scrapped locomotives
Standard gauge steam locomotives of Great Britain

Passenger locomotives